Millburg is an unincorporated community and, a census-designated place in Benton Charter Township at  near the boundary with Bainbridge Township in Berrien County. It is situated several miles east of Benton Harbor and just east of the intersection of I-94 and I-196/US 31. It was the site of the first settlement within the township. Jehiel Enos settled there in 1834. Per the 2020 Census, the population was 578.

Demographics

2020 census

Note: the US Census treats Hispanic/Latino as an ethnic category. This table excludes Latinos from the racial categories and assigns them to a separate category. Hispanics/Latinos can be of any race.

References

Census-designated places in Michigan
Census-designated places in Berrien County, Michigan
Unincorporated communities in Michigan
Unincorporated communities in Berrien County, Michigan
Populated places established in 1834
1834 establishments in Michigan Territory